Parajana gabunica is a moth in the family Eupterotidae described by Per Olof Christopher Aurivillius in 1892. It is found in Cameroon, the Democratic Republic of the Congo (Orientale), Gabon and Kenya.

References

Moths described in 1892
Eupterotinae